Kao the Kangaroo is a platform video game developed by X-Ray Interactive for Microsoft Windows, Dreamcast and Game Boy Advance. During development it was known as Denis the Kangaroo.

Plot
Kao is a young kangaroo living with his family in the jungle when they are one day captured by a ruthless hunter and his goons. It's up to Kao to drive the invaders from his home and save his family.

Release
The game was marketed worldwide by Titus Interactive, both for PCs and for the Sega Dreamcast console, releasing in Europe on December 8, 2000. The game was released earlier in Poland by Licop Empik Multimedia as a PC exclusive. It scored a major success, exceeding 45,000 copies in Poland alone where it remained in the Top 10 for a considerable time.

The Game Boy Advance version was released on December 11, 2001.

The game, alongside its sequels, were added to GOG.com in February 2021.

Reception

Kao the Kangaroo received "mixed" reviews on all platforms according to the review aggregation website Metacritic. Greg Orlando of Next Generation called the Dreamcast version "a marsuperior adventure. Pardon the horrible pun – please".

Sequels
A sequel called Kao the Kangaroo: Round 2 was released for the PS2, GameCube, Xbox, and Windows on April 15, 2005. About 5 months later, a remake of the second game called Kao Challengers was released on October 28 only for the PSP. Later in 2005, a second sequel called Kao the Kangaroo: Mystery of the Volcano was released only for Windows. A new game, developed by Tate Multimedia, was released on May 27, 2022.

References

External links

2000 video games
Action-adventure games
Single-player video games
Windows games
Dreamcast games
3D platform games
Game Boy Advance games
Cancelled Nintendo 64 games
Kao the Kangaroo
Video games about kangaroos and wallabies
Video games about families
Video games set in Australia
Australian outback
Jungles in fiction
Video games developed in Poland